The 2020-21 Creighton Bluejays men's basketball team represented Creighton University in the 2020-21 NCAA Division I men's basketball season. The Bluejays were led by 11th-year head coach Greg McDermott and played their home games at the CHI Health Center Omaha in Omaha, Nebraska, as members of the Big East Conference. They finished the season 22–9, 14–6 to finish second in Big East play. They defeated Butler and UConn in the Big East tournament before losing to Georgetown in the championship game. They received an at-large bid to the NCAA tournament as the No. 5 seed in the West region. They defeated UC Santa Barbara and Ohio to advance to the Sweet Sixteen. This marked the first time Creighton had won consecutive games in the same tournament and the first time they had advanced to the Sweet Sixteen since 1974 when the tournament had 25 teams. There they lost to eventual National Runner-Up Gonzaga.

On March 4, 2021, head coach McDermott was suspended for using racially insensitive language to his team. On March 8, the school reinstated McDermott after only missing one game and allowing him to coach in the Big East and NCAA Tournaments.

Previous season
The Bluejays finished the 2019–20 season 24–7, 13–5 in Big East play to finish tied for first place. As the No. 1 seed in the Big East tournament, they were slated to play St. John's in the quarterfinals, but the tournament was cancelled at halftime of the game due to the COVID-19 pandemic, along with the rest of the NCAA postseason.

Offseason

Departures

2020 recruiting class

2021 Recruiting class

Incoming transfers

Roster

Schedule and results

|-
!colspan=12 style=|Regular season

|-
!colspan=9 style=|Big East tournament

|-
!colspan=9 style=|NCAA tournament

Rankings

^Coaches did not release a Week 1 poll.

References

Creighton Bluejays men's basketball seasons
Creighton
Creighton
Creighton
Creighton